Yekmaleh-ye Sofla (also romanized as Yekmāleh-ye Soflá; also known as Yekmāleh and Yekmāleh-ye Pā’īn) is a village in Chaldoran-e Jonubi Rural District, in the Central District of Chaldoran County, West Azerbaijan Province, Iran. At the 2006 census, its population was 37, in 9 families.

References 

Populated places in Chaldoran County